This is a list of the famous and notable people from Kimberley, Northern Cape, South Africa.

List of famous people from Kimberley, Northern Cape


A

 Benny Alexander, who adopted the name Khoisan X, General Secretary of the Pan Africanist Congress
 Diane Awerbuck, South African novelist.

B

 Frances Baard, trade-unionist who grew up in Kimberley - and after whom the District Municipality is named.
 Xenophon Constantine Balaskas, Springbok cricketer, 1930-1939.
 Barney Barnato
 Alfred Beit
 Benjamin Bennett, author.
 Dr Rudolph Bigalke, director of the National Zoological Gardens of South Africa (Pretoria), 1927 to 1962.
 Rudolph Carl Bigalke, zoologist and one-time director of the McGregor Museum.
 Charl Bouwer, paralympic swimmer and 2012 gold medallist, born in Kimberley

C 

 Clive Mopeleti, Filmmaker and Philanthropist.

D

 Clive Derby-Lewis, politician, imprisoned for his role in the assassination of Chris Hani.  Born in Cape Town but grew up in Kimberley.
 Manne Dipico
 Frank Dobbin, rugby player

E

F

G

 Kgosi Galeshewe, BaTlhaping leader and anti-colonial resistance leader.
 Henry Richard Giddy, member of the Red Cap Party that led the rush on Colesberg Kopje or 'New Rush', later Kimberley

H
 Dorian Haarhoff
Reeza Hendricks, Professional cricketer for the Highveld Lions and The Proteas.
 Richard Henyekane, South African football striker.
 William Benbow Humphreys (1889-1965), politician, founder of and principal benefactor behind Kimberley's William Humphreys Art Gallery, and recipient of the Freedom of the City of Kimberley.

I

J

 Dan Jacobson, author.
 Leander Starr Jameson

K
 Victor Khojane, otherwise known as Dr Victor, reggae and R&B musician
 Aggrey Klaaste, Editor of The Sowetan, grew up in Kimberley.
 Bernard Klisser, after whom the Kimberley suburb Klisserville is named.
 Jbe' Kruger, golfer.

L

 George Labram, De Beers Engineer who designed and built Long Cecil.
 Richard Liversidge, ornithologist and museum director.

M

 Gail Nkoane Mabalane, actress, model and singer
 Phakamile Mabija, anti-apartheid activist.
 Thebe Magugu, fashion designer.
 Adolph Malan, better known as Sailor Malan, famed World War II RAF fighter pilot and later leading member of the anti-Apartheid Torch Commando and Springbok Legion in South Africa.
 Brian Marajh, Bishop of George.
 Manie Maritz, Boer general.
 Z.K. Matthews, President of the African National Congress, spent his youth in Kimberley.
 Sarah Gertrude Millin, author, spent her formative years, 1888–1912, in Kimberley and the nearby Waldeck's Plant.
 Harold Arthur Morris, Freeman of Kimberley.
 Karen Muir, Olympic medalist (swimming).

N
Gideon "Mgibe" Nxumalo - Jazz pianist, arranger, composer.

O

 Ernest Oppenheimer
 Harry Oppenheimer

P

 Sol Plaatje
 Dipuo Peters, second Premier of the Northern Cape Province.
 Frank Templeton Prince, poet.

Q

R

 Cecil Rhodes
 J.B. Robinson
 Dr Donald Ross, cardiac surgeon
 Bevil Rudd, Olympic medalist (athletics).
 Charles Rudd

S

 A.H.M. Scholtz, author.
 Olive Schreiner, author, who lived in Kimberley 1894-1897.
 Gert Smal, former rugby union player and coach.
 Robert Sobukwe, founder of the Pan Africanist Congress.
 Richard Southey (colonial administrator)
 Henrietta Stockdale

T

 Jimmy Tau, football player and Kaizer Chiefs captain
 William M. Timlin, artist and architect, responsible for many notable Kimberley buildings.

U

V

W

 Charles Warren
 Maria Wilman

X

Y

Z

References

People from Kimberley, Northern Cape